Several groups claim they descend from the ancient Israelites. The issue has been especially relevant since the establishment of the State of Israel and an individual or a group's request to immigrate to Israel under its Law of Return. In that context, claims of affiliation with the Israelites give rise to questions of "who is a Jew?" Some of these claims have been recognized, while other claims are still under review and other claims have been rejected.

There were numerous events in Jewish history which forced the Jews to leave the Land of Israel and compelled them to disperse throughout the world. The most significant of these events are recorded in the Hebrew Bible and they propelled entire Jewish and pre-Judaic Israelite communities out of the Land of Israel. These events include the fall of the northern Kingdom of Israel in about the 720s BCE to the Neo-Assyrian Empire and the southern Kingdom of Judah in 586 BCE to the Neo-Babylonian Empire, but there have been other events and periods when Israelites left the Land, either as individuals or in groups. These diaspora communities came into existence (sometimes voluntarily) as a result of Jews and Israelites fleeing the land before the onslaught of invading forces, because of forced deportations, or because of enslavement. Some families or even some whole communities were forced to move from one country to another because of persecutions, and other families or communities ceased to exist. Although some form of contact had been maintained between most of the mainstream Jewish communities in the diaspora over the millennia, contact had been lost with some Jewish communities, and as a result, they came to be regarded as lost by the mainstream Jewish communities.

As a result of the isolation of some Jewish communities, their practices and observances have diverged in some respects. Several groups of people from diverse parts of the world have claimed to be affiliated with or descended from the ancient Israelites. Some claim this affiliation on the basis of affinity with the Jewish people, while other groups claim this affiliation independent of this affinity.

It is accepted that the Jews and the Samaritans are descendants of the ancient Israelites.

Claimed Israelite descent, with lineage proven, recognized as Jewish

Bukharan Jews

According to ancient texts, Israelites began traveling to Central Asia to work as traders during the reign of King David of Jerusalem as far back as the 10th century B.C.E. Bukharan Jews contain descendents from the Tribe of Naphtali and the Tribe of Issachar of the Ten Lost Tribes, who were exiled during the Assyrian captivity of Israel in the 7th century BCE. Isakharov (in different spellings) is a common surname.

The Bukharan Jews originally called themselves Bnei Israel (children of the northern Kingdom of Israel), which relates specifically to the Israelites of Assyrian captivity. The term Bukharan was coined by European travelers who visited Central Asia around the 16th century. Since most of the Jewish community at the time lived under the Emirate of Bukhara, they came to be known as Bukharan Jews. The name by which the community called itself is "Bnei Isro'il" (Israelites of the Northern Kingdom of Israel). Their Muslim neighbors would call them Yahudi, which is misidentification, since it is specific to the southern Kingdom of Judah, but the Bnei Israel self-designation emphasizes their Israelite origins from the northern Kingdom of Israel. 

In 1793, Rabbi Yosef Maimon, a Sephardic Jew originally from Tetuan, Morocco and a missionary kabbalist in Safed, traveled to Bukhara to collect money and spread the Sephardic beliefs amongst the native Israelites of the regions. Prior to Maimon's arrival, the Jews of Bukhara followed the Persian religious tradition. Maimon aggressively advocated that the Israelites of Bukhara adopt Sephardic traditions. Many of the Israelites wanted to keep their ancient Israelite traditions and were opposed to this and the community split into two factions. The followers of the foreign Maimon clan eventually won the struggle against the native Israelites for religious authority, and Bukharan Israelites lost their Israelite traditions and were forced to adopt to Sephardi customs. Some people credit Maimon with causing a revival of Jewish practice among Bukharan Jews which they claim was in danger of dying out. There is evidence that there were Torah scholars present upon his arrival to Bukhara, but because they followed the Persian rite their practices were forcefully rejected as incorrect by Maimon.

Cochin Jews

Israelite traders came to Kerala, India, as early as 700 BCE and settled there. Cochin Jews, also called Malabar Jews, are the descendants of Israelites who settled in the South Indian port city of Cochin. They traditionally spoke Judæo-Malayalam, a form of the Malayalam tongue, native to the state of Kerala. Several rounds of immigration of the Jewish diaspora into Kerala led to a diversity among the Cochin Jews.

Some sources say that the earliest Jews were those who settled in the Malabar Coast during the reign of Solomon, and after the Kingdom of Israel split into two. They are sometimes referred to as the "black Jews." The Paradesi Jews, also called "White Jews," settled later, coming to India from Middle Eastern and European nations such as the Netherlands and Spain, and bringing with them the Ladino language. A notable settlement of Spanish and Portuguese Jews (Sephardim) starting in the 15th century was at Goa, but this settlement eventually disappeared. In the 17th and 18th centuries, Cochin received an influx of Jewish settlers from the Middle East, North Africa and Spain.

An old but not particularly reliable tradition says that Cochin Jews came in mass to Cranganore (an ancient port, near Cochin) after the destruction of the Temple in 70 CE. They had, in effect, their own principality for many centuries until a chieftainship dispute broke out between two brothers in the 15th century. The dispute led neighboring princes to dispossess them. In 1524, the Muslims, backed by the ruler of Calicut (today called Kozhikode), attacked the Jews of Cranganore on the pretext that they were tampering with the pepper trade. Most Jews fled to Cochin and went under the protection of the Hindu Raja there. He granted them a site for their own town that later acquired the name "Jew Town" (by which it is still known).

Unfortunately for the Cochin Jews, the Portuguese occupied Cochin during this same period and they indulged in persecution of the Jews until the Dutch displaced them in 1660. The Dutch Protestants were tolerant, and the Jews prospered. In 1795 Cochin passed into the British sphere of influence. In the 19th century, Cochin Jews lived in the towns of Cochin, Ernakulam, Aluva and Parur.

After India gained its independence in 1947 and Israel was established as a nation, most of the Cochin Jews made Aliyah and emigrated to Israel in the mid-1950s.

Claimed Israelite descent, with lineage proven, not recognized as Jewish

Samaritans
The Samaritans, once a comparatively large, but now a very small ethnic and religious group, consist of about 850 people who are currently living in Israel and Samaria. They regard themselves as the descendants of the tribes of Ephraim and Manasseh, the sons of Joseph.

Several genetic studies on the Samaritan population have been conducted by using haplogroup comparisons as well as the results of wide-genome genetic studies. Of the 12 Samaritan males who were used in the analysis, 10 of them (83%) had Y chromosomes which belong to haplogroup J, which includes three of the four Samaritan families. The Joshua-Marhiv family belongs to Haplogroup J-M267 (formerly "J1"), while the Danafi and Tsedakah families belong to haplogroup J-M172 (formerly "J2"), and can be further distinguished by M67, the derived allele of which has been found in the Danafi family. The only Samaritan family not found in haplogroup J was the Cohen family (Tradition: Tribe of Levi) which was found haplogroup E-M78 (formerly "E3b1a M78"). This article predated the change of the classification of haplogroup E3b1-M78 to E3b1a-M78 and the further subdivision of E3b1a-M78 into 6 subclades based on the research of Cruciani, et al.

The 2004 article on the genetic ancestry of the Samaritans by Shen et al. concluded from a sample comparing Samaritans to several Jewish populations, all currently living in Israel—representing the Beta Israel, Ashkenazi Jews, Iraqi Jews, Libyan Jews, Moroccan Jews, and Yemenite Jews, as well as Israeli Druze and Palestinians—that "the principal components analysis suggested a common ancestry of Samaritan and Jewish patrilineages. Most of the former may be traced back to a common ancestor in what is today identified as the paternally inherited Israelite high priesthood (Cohanim) with a common ancestor projected to the time of the Assyrian conquest of the kingdom of Israel."

Archaeologists Aharoni, et al., estimated that this "exile of peoples to and from Israel under the Assyrians" took place during ca. 734–712 BC. The authors speculated that when the Assyrians conquered the Northern Kingdom of Israel, resulting in the exile of many of the Israelites, a subgroup of the Israelites that remained in the Land of Israel "married Assyrian and female exiles relocated from other conquered lands, which was a typical Assyrian policy to obliterate national identities." The study goes on to say that "Such a scenario could explain why Samaritan Y chromosome lineages cluster tightly with Jewish Y lineages, while their mitochondrial lineages are closest to Iraqi Jewish and Israeli Arab mtDNA sequences." Non-Jewish Iraqis were not sampled in this study; however, mitochondrial lineages of Jewish communities tend to correlate with their non-Jewish host populations, unlike paternal lineages which almost always correspond to Israelite lineages.

The Samaritans also retain ancient Israelite traditions that predate Judaic customs and the Oral Law. The Samaritan Pentateuch is preserved in a Paleo-Hebrew derived script that predates the Babylonian exile and further lends credence to the Israelite lineage of the Samaritans. Samaritans adhere to a version of the Torah, known as the Samaritan Pentateuch, which differs from the Masoretic text in some respects, sometimes, it differs from the Masoretic text in important ways, and to a lesser extent, it also differs from the Septuagint. The Samaritans do not regard the Tanakh as an accurate or a truthful history. They only regard Moses as a prophet, speak their own version of Hebrew, and while they do not consider themselves a part of Judaism, the Samaritans do consider Jews fellow Israelites and they also view themselves and Jews as the two authentic houses of Israel. Less archaeological work has been performed on investigating the direction and the regions of the post-Assyrian exile largely because those enthusiastic in pursuing this path of research usually lack skills while archaeologists lack funds, contrary to the situation in Israel where the period of the Judges has been to some degree substantiated by physical finds, and because the interest in pursuing this subject is seen as a semi-mythical pursuit at the edge of serious research. Usually the lack of archaeological evidence has been explained by the assimilation theory which proposes that the exiled Israelites adopted so many of the traits of the surrounding cultures and that any unearthed artefacts cannot be linked to them with any certainty.

Since 539 BC, when the Jews began to return from the Babylonian captivity, many Jews have rejected the Samaritan claim of descent from the Israelite tribes, but some Jews have considered them a sect of Judaism. The advent of genetic studies, the discovery of the Paleo-Hebrew script, and textual comparisons between the Samaritan Pentateuch and the Masoretic text have all made it very difficult to refute the Israelite origin of the Samaritans, causing the majority of the Jewish world in modern times to view the Samaritans as an authentic Israelite group.

Claimed Israelite descent, with lineage unproven, recognized as Jews

Bene Israel
The Bene Israel claim a lineage to the kohanim, descendants of Aaron. According to Bene Israel tradition, the Bene Israel arrived in India in the first century BCE after a shipwreck stranded seven Jewish families at Navagaon near Alibag, just south of Mumbai. The families grew and integrated with the local Maharashtrian population, adopting their language, dress and food. They were nicknamed the śaniwar telī ("Saturday oil-pressers") by the local population as they abstained from work on Saturdays, the Jewish Sabbath.

Genetic analysis shows that the Bene Israel of India "cluster with neighbouring autochthonous populations in Ethiopia and western India, respectively, despite a clear paternal link between the Bene Israel and the Levant."

Beta Israel

Beta Israel (Ethiopian Jews or Falasha) have a tradition of descent from the lost tribe of Dan. Their tradition states that the tribe of Dan attempted to avoid the civil war in the Kingdom of Israel between Rehoboam, son of Solomon and Jeroboam, son of Nebat, by resettling in Egypt. From there they moved southwards up the Nile into Ethiopia, and the Beta Israel are descended from these Danites.

They have a long history of practicing such Jewish traditions as kashrut, Sabbath and Passover (see Haymanot) and for this reason their Jewishness was accepted by the Chief Rabbinate of Israel and the Israeli government in 1975.

They emigrated to Israel en masse during the 1980s and 1990s, as Jews, under the Law of Return, during Israel's Operation Moses and Operation Solomon. Some who claim to be Beta Israel still live in Ethiopia. Their claims were formally accepted by the Chief Rabbinate of Israel, and they are accordingly generally regarded as Jews.

Genetic studies upon them had found that the Beta Israel as a general community do not cluster with the rest of the world's Jewry; but in fact are indistinguishable from local non-Jewish Ethiopians. The diversity observed among the Ethiopian Jews reflects the variety of maternal lineages that were present during the founding and propagation of this community in East Africa.

Bnei Menashe

The Bnei Menashe is a group in India claiming to be the descendants of the Tribe of Manasseh. In 2005 members of the Bnei Menashe who have studied Hebrew and who observe the Sabbath and other Jewish laws received the support of the Sephardic Chief Rabbi of Israel in arranging formal conversions to Judaism. Some have converted and emigrated to Israel under the Law of Return.

According to their oral tradition, along with the rest of the tribes of Israel, the Bnei Menashe were exiled to Assyria (722 BCE). Assyria was conquered by Babylon (612 BCE), which later was conquered by Persia (457 BCE), which later was conquered by Alexander the Great of Greece (331 BCE), from here they were deported to Afghanistan. They could not settle in Afghanistan, so from there they headed east until they reached the area of the Tibetan-Chinese border. They finally settled in China in 231 BCE.

This is when they realized that they probably should have stayed in Afghanistan, because the Chinese were extremely cruel to them and enslaved them. A sizable portion of them managed to escape and went into hiding from the Chinese in mountainous areas called Sinlung, which later became another name for the Tribe of Menasseh. Another name that they are commonly called are "cave people" or "mountain people". They were in hiding for two generations, during which they lived in extreme poverty, having almost no personal belongings, although they kept the Torah Scroll with them the whole time. Gradually, they started to come out of hiding, and they eventually started assimilating and picking up Chinese influences because of their morbid experiences in China, they decided to leave. They set out west, through Thailand and eventually reached Mandalay, a city in Myanmar. From there they reached the Chin Mountains. In the 18th century a part of them migrated to Mizoram and Manipur which are located in North-East India.

With the arrival of Christian missionaries in the area, the whole community was converted to Christianity and all of their written history was destroyed. Today, there are an estimated 2 million people who can be considered Bnei Menashe, however, only about 9,000 of them returned to Judaism.

Claimed Israelite descent, with lineage unproven, not recognized as Jews

Banu Israil

The Banu Israil is a Muslim community found in the state of Uttar Pradesh, India. The name means "Children of Israel", and the community claims descent from the Jewish community of Medina. They belong to the Shaikh caste, and typically carry the surname Israily.

Bene Ephraim

The Bene Ephraim, also called Telugu Jews because they speak Telugu, are a small community of Jews living primarily in Kottareddipalem, a village outside Guntur, India, near the delta of the River Krishna.

The Bene Ephraim trace their observance of Judaism back to ancient times, and they recount a history which is similar to that of the Bnei Menashe in the northeastern Indian states of Mizoram and Manipur. They adopted Christianity after the arrival of Baptist missionaries around the beginning of the 19th century.

Since 1981, about 50 families around Kottareddipalem and Ongole (capital of the nearby district of Prakasham) have learned Judaism, learned Hebrew, and have sought recognition from other Jewish communities around the world. Because of the very recent reemergence of this community, and also because of the current overwhelming emphasis on the use of Hebrew as a living language, rather than merely as a liturgical language, the impact of Hebrew on the daily speech of this community has not led to the development, as yet, of a distinctly identifiable "Judæo-Telugu" language or dialect. (See Jewish languages.)

The community has been visited over the years, by several groups of rabbis, who have thus far not seen it fit to extend the same recognition to this community as that which was recently extended to the Bnei Menashe.

Falash Mura

Knanaya

Igbo Jews

Lemba people

As recounted in Lemba oral tradition, the ancestor of the Buba clan "had a leadership role in bringing the Lemba out of Israel" and eventually into Southern Africa. A genetic study found that 50% of the males in the Buba clan has the Cohen marker, a proportion higher than that which is found in the general Jewish population. While not defining the Lemba as Jews, the genetic results confirm the oral accounts of ancestral males originating from outside Africa, and specifically from southern Arabia.

More recently, Mendez et al. (2011) observed that a moderately high frequency of the studied Lemba samples carries Y-DNA haplogroup T, which is also considered to be of Near Eastern origin. The Lemba T carriers belonged exclusively to T1b, which is rare and was not sampled in indigenous Jews of the Near East or North Africa. T1b has been observed at low frequencies in the Bulgarian and Ashkenazi Jews as well as in a few Levantine populations.

Recent research published in the South African Medical Journal studied Y chromosome variations in two groups of Lemba, one South African and the other Zimbabwean (the Remba). It concluded that "While it was not possible to trace unequivocally the origins of the non-African Y chromosomes in the Lemba and Remba, this study does not support the earlier claims of their Jewish genetic heritage." The researcher suggested "a stronger link with Middle Eastern populations, probably the result of trade activity in the Indian Ocean."

Israelite affiliation claimed independent of affiliation with the Jewish people

Ten Lost Tribes

Claims of descent from the Ten Lost Tribes have been made by a variety of non-Jewish groups.  These groups include the Pashtuns (see Theory of Pashtun descent from Israelites), the British (see British Israelism and Christian Identity), the French (see French Israelism), the Scandinavians (see Nordic Israelism), the Kurds, the Japanese (see Japanese-Jewish common ancestry theory), and many others.

Similarly, Black Hebrew Israelites are groups of African Americans who claim that they are the descendants of the ancient Israelites. To varying degrees, Black Hebrews adhere to the religious beliefs and practices of both Christianity and Judaism. However, they are not recognized as Jews by the Jewish community, nor are they recognized as Christians. Many of them choose to identify themselves as Hebrew Israelites or Black Hebrews rather than identify themselves as Jews in order to indicate their claimed historic connections.

The Church of Jesus Christ of Latter-day Saints

Members of the Latter Day Saint movement believe that after they have been baptized and after they have received the Gift of the Holy Ghost, they have become "regathered" as Israelites, either as people who have been recovered from the scattered tribes of Israel, or as Gentiles who have been adopted and grafted into Israel, and as a result, they have become the chosen people of God.  Members receive a declaration of lineage (which tribe they belong to) as part of their patriarchal blessing.

These religious denominations are derived from a movement which was launched by Joseph Smith, and almost half of all of their members live in the United States; the movement's members do not strictly believe that they are ethnic Jews as such, instead, they believe that they can use the term Israelites in reference to members of many different cultures, including Jews. They believe that certain Old Testament passages are prophecies which imply that the tribe of Joseph (Ephraim and Manasseh) will play a prominent role in the spreading of the gospel to all scattered Israelites in the last days, and the tribe of Judah will also play a prominent role in the last days as well as during the Millennium.

See also 
Genetic history of the Middle East
Genetic studies on Jews
History of ancient Israel and Judah
Jewish diaspora
Jewish ethnic divisions
Jewish history

References